Hrůza, Hruza is a Czech surname, English Fright. Notable people with the surname include:
George J. Hruza, Czechoslovak-born American dermatologist 
Vladimír Hrůza (born 1960), Czech cyclist

Czech-language surnames